Randolph Township is an inactive township in St. Francois County, in the U.S. state of Missouri.

Randolph Township was erected in 1858, taking its name from John Randolph of Roanoke.

References

Townships in Missouri
Townships in St. Francois County, Missouri